Corinthian Hall may refer to:

Corinthian Hall (Rochester, New York) 
Kansas City Museum, whose main building is Corinthian Hall

See also
 Corinthian wall